Injection site reactions are allergic reactions that result in cutaneous necrosis that may occur at sites of medication injection, typically presenting in one of two forms, (1) those associated with intravenous infusion or (2) those related to intramuscular injection.  Intramuscular injections may produce a syndrome called livedo dermatitis.

See also
 Application site reaction
 Vitamin K reactions
 Skin lesion
 List of cutaneous conditions

References

Drug eruptions